The Justice Party is a political party in Egypt. It was founded after the Egyptian Revolution of 2011 by a group of people from different movements that led to the revolution including the April 6 Youth Movement, the National Association for Change and Kefaya.

History 
After the 2011 Egyptian revolution, a group of youth taking part in the revolution announced they would be founding their own party. In May 2011, the party was officially founded after gathering 5,000 signatures from all across Egypt. Its foundation was celebrated with the first party conference being held in Al-Azhar Park. It supports centrism and secularism.

The founding committee for the Justice Party included democracy activists such as Mostafa el-Naggar, Ahmed Shoukry, Abdel Monem Emam in addition to Hisham Akram and Mohamed Gabr. The party had a group of consultants which included Egyptian economist Mona ElBaradei, sister of presidential candidate Mohamed ElBaradei, Egyptian political scientist Amr el-Shobaky, as well as Abdelgelil Mostafa, the general coordinator of Egyptian Movement for Change, also known as Kefaya and Egyptian poet and activist Abdul Rahman Yusuf, son of Islamic theologian Yusuf al-Qaradawi.

The party fielded candidates for about a third of Egyptian parliamentary seats during the 2011-2012 parliamentary elections that started in November 2011.

Political ideology 
The Justice Party welcomes people from different political ideologies on the political right and left, and described itself as a party of political programs rather than a certain political ideology. Its policies focus on solving education, health and employment issues in Egypt as well as achieving the demands called for by the Egyptian revolution.

References

External links
  

Political parties in Egypt
Political parties established in 2011
2011 establishments in Egypt